Edmund W. Eyre (c.1856–1929) was an Irish politician. He was an independent member of Seanad Éireann from 1922 to 1928. A former official of Dublin Corporation, he was nominated to the Seanad by the President of the Executive Council in 1922 for 6 years. He did not contest the 1928 Seanad election.

Edmund William Eyre, the son of a Dublin solicitor, was City Treasurer of Dublin for twenty-eight years up to 1921. He retired from the Seanad on the grounds of ill-health and died at his home at Stillorgan, Dublin, on 7 July 1929 aged 73.

References

1856 births
1929 deaths
Independent members of Seanad Éireann
Members of the 1922 Seanad
Members of the 1925 Seanad
Politicians from Dublin (city)